Raukaua anomalus is a species of shrub native to New Zealand. It is found throughout the country from lowland to montane shrub and forest areas.

Raukaua anomalus grows up to 3 metres tall with small 1–3 cm long leaves that are alternately arranged along the densely divaricating branches.

Raukaua anomalus produces tiny green-white flowers along its branches from November to January. This is followed by small (5 mm) white berries with purple marks.

References

anomalus
Flora of New Zealand
Divaricating plants